Jeremy Kyne (born May 2, 1983) is a Canadian international rugby union player who plays as a flanker. 
He was a member of the Canadian squad at the 2011 Rugby World Cup.

References

External links
ESPN Profile

1983 births
Living people
Canadian rugby union players
Canada international rugby union players